Zovax is a genus of moths of the family Crambidae described by Stanisław Błeszyński in 1962.

Species
Zovax vangoghi Bleszynski, 1965
Zovax venus Bassi, 2013
Zovax whiteheadii (E. Wollaston, 1879)

References

"Zovax Bleszynski, 1962". Butterflies and Moths of the World. Natural History Museum, London. Retrieved November 23, 2017.

Crambinae
Crambidae genera
Taxa named by Stanisław Błeszyński